The BMW Tennis Championship was a professional tennis tournament played on outdoor hard courts. It was part of the ATP Challenger Tour. It was held annually at the Sunrise Tennis Club in Sunrise, Florida, United States, from 2004 until 2010 and was replaced with the Dallas Tennis Classic.

Past finals

Singles

Doubles

External links
Official website
ITF search

 
ATP Challenger Tour
Hard court tennis tournaments in the United States
Defunct tennis tournaments in Florida
2004 establishments in Florida
2010 disestablishments in Florida
Sports in Sunrise, Florida
Recurring sporting events established in 2004
Recurring sporting events disestablished in 2010